Gemmingen (South Franconian: Gemminge) is a town in the district of Heilbronn in Baden-Württemberg in southern Germany.

References

Heilbronn (district)